The 1941 North Texas State Teachers Eagles football team represented the North Texas State Teachers College (later renamed the University of North Texas) as a member of the Lone Star Conference (LSC) during the 1941 college football season.  In its 13th and final season under head coach Jack Sisco, the team compiled a 7–1 record (4–0 against LSC opponents) and won the LSC championship. The team's loss was against SMU. The team played its home games at Eagle Field in Denton, Texas.

Schedule

References

North Texas State Teachers
North Texas Mean Green football seasons
Lone Star Conference football champion seasons
North Texas State Teachers Eagles football